John Wesley Brown (1873 – 8 November 1944) was Conservative Party member of the UK House of Commons for Middlesbrough East between the general elections of 1922 and 1923.

References

External links 
 

1873 births
1944 deaths
Conservative Party (UK) MPs for English constituencies
UK MPs 1922–1923